Basalt Falls is a waterfall on the Dean River in the Chilcotin District of the Central Interior of British Columbia, located north of the community of Anahim Lake.

See also
Anahim Volcanic Belt
Anahim hotspot

References

Waterfalls of British Columbia
Landforms of the Chilcotin
Range 3 Coast Land District